Goodwins Corner is an unincorporated community in Center Township, Union County, in the U.S. state of Indiana.

History
A post office was established at Goodwins Corner in 1871, and remained in operation until 1903. The community was named after the Goodwin family of settlers.

Geography

References

Unincorporated communities in Union County, Indiana
Unincorporated communities in Indiana